Seán Heuston (born John Joseph Heuston; 21 February 1891 – 8 May 1916) was an Irish republican rebel and member of Fianna Éireann who took part in the Easter Rising of 1916. With about 20 Volunteers, he held the Mendicity Institution on the River Liffey for over two days, though it was originally only intended to be held for 3–4 hours. He was executed by firing squad on 8 May in Kilmainham Gaol. His courtmartial record at Kew spells his name as Hewston J.J..

Early life
Heuston was born in at Gloucester Street in Dublin on 21 February 1891, the son of clerk John Heuston and Maria McDonald. Educated by the Christian Brothers, he later worked as a railway clerk in Limerick and while there took an active part in Fianna Éireann, of which he was an officer. Seán Heuston arranged for members who could not afford to buy their uniforms to do so by paying small weekly sums. Under his guidance the Fianna in Limerick had a course which encompassed not only drilling, including signalling, scout training and weapons training, but also lectures on Irish history and Irish classes.

Irish Volunteers and Fianna Eireann
In 1913 Heuston was transferred to Dublin Fianna, and was appointed to the Emmet Sluagh. He went on to join the ranks of the Irish Volunteers and played a prominent part in the Easter Rising. He was Director of Training for Fianna Eireann as well as being Vice-commandant of the Dublin Battalion and Commander of the 5th company from August 1915 to Easter 1916.

Easter Rising
Heuston was the Officer Commanding the Irish Volunteers assigned to hold the Mendicity Institution (now called Heustons Fort) on the south side of Dublin city. Acting under orders from James Connolly, Heuston was to hold this position for three or four hours, to delay the advance of British troops. This delay was necessary to give the headquarters staff time to prepare their defences.  Having successfully held the position for the specified period, he was to go on to hold it for over two days, with twenty-six Volunteers. With his position becoming untenable against considerable numbers, and the building almost completely surrounded, he sent a dispatch to Connolly informing him of their position. The dispatch was carried by two Volunteers, P. J. Stephenson and Seán McLaughlin, who had to avoid both sniper fire and British troops across the city. It was soon after sending this dispatch that Heuston decided to surrender.

The Surrender

Séamus Brennan, a member of the Mendicity Institution Garrison under Heuston, gave the following account of the decision to surrender:

Prisoners
According to the statement given by Séamus Brennan to Piaras F. Mac Lochlainn, author of Last Words, the British troops were "infuriated when they saw the pygmy force that had given them such a stiff battle and caused them so many casualties".Séamus Brennan never saw Seán Heuston again after being transferred to Arbour Hill Detention Barracks.

Court martial
Heuston had been transferred to Richmond Barracks, and on 4 May 1916, he was tried by court-martial. On the Sunday, 7 May 1916, the verdict of the court martial was communicated to him that he had been sentenced to death and was to be shot at dawn the following morning.

Execution

Prior to his execution he was attended by Father Albert, O.F.M. Cap in his final hours. Father Albert wrote an account of those hours up to and including the execution: Father Albert concluded:

References

 Gibney, John, Seán Heuston, Dublin: O'Brien Press, 2013.

1891 births
1916 deaths
Irish rebels
People from Dublin (city)
Executed participants in the Easter Rising
Irish soldiers
Members of the Irish Republican Brotherhood
Irish republicans
People educated at O'Connell School